Andrew McLennan may refer to:
Andrew Robert McLennan, Canadian provincial politician
Andrew Snoid, New Zealand singer, originally Andrew McLennan